Doina Furcoi Solomonov (born 4 September 1945 in Miloșești, Ialomița County) is a former Romanian handball player who competed in the 1976 Summer Olympics.

She was part of the Romanian handball team, which finished fourth in the Olympic tournament. She played four matches and scored six goals.

References

1945 births
Living people
Romanian female handball players 
Olympic handball players of Romania

Handball players at the 1976 Summer Olympics
People from Ialomița County